Josef Haunzwickel (4 January 1915 – 19 May 2001) was an Austrian athlete. He competed in the men's pole vault at the 1936 Summer Olympics.

References

1915 births
2001 deaths
Athletes (track and field) at the 1936 Summer Olympics
Austrian male pole vaulters
Olympic athletes of Austria
Place of birth missing